KJDS (101.9 FM) is a Spanish Religious station in Hot Springs, Arkansas. It broadcasts with an ERP of 3.1 kW (3,100 watts) from its broadcast tower on Pearcy Road, southwest of Hot Springs in Garland County, Arkansas.

Prior to being sold to KHCB, the station was owned and operated by US Stations, LLC, a local company that also owns KZNG, KBHS, KLXQ, KQUS and KLAZ in Hot Springs and KLBL in Malvern.

History
On December 7, 2016, KLXQ was sold from US Stations, LLC to Central Arkansas Radio Group, LLC and changed their format from classic rock branded as "101.9 The Rocket" to classic hits. "The Rocket" branding was moved to 96.7 Hot Springs and became known as "96.7 The Rocket".

On December 14, 2016, KLXQ changed their call letters to KHRK.

On February 24, 2017, KHRK changed their format from classic hits to a simulcast of KHCB 105.7 Houston, Texas, as a result of a sale from Central Arkansas Radio Group, LLC to Houston Christian Broadcasters, Inc.

On March 7, 2017, KHRK changed their call letters to KHHS.

Studio location
The US Stations broadcast studio is in the former KVTH-TV Channel 26 building near the Hot Springs Mall. The previous KLXQ studio was in the upstairs part of the television studio, but has since moved to a new addition built in late 2006.

The former KHRK-FM previously shared a building with sister stations KQUS, KLXQ, and KZNG.

References

External links

Radio stations established in 1996
1996 establishments in Arkansas
JDS
Hot Springs, Arkansas
Spanish-language radio stations in Arkansas